Maazee is a 2000 Maldivian drama film directed by Mohamed Ali Manik. Produced by Feeroz Audio, the film stars Ismail Wajeeh, Jamsheedha Ahmed, Mariyam Nazima, Ali Shimree and Aminath Rasheedha in pivotal roles.

The film marks actors Wajeeh and Jamsheedha's only collaboration in the film industry. The film received warm response from critics while Wajeeh picked his performance in the film as one of his "finest and accomplished role". Maazee also marks actor Ali Seezan's first work in the industry by working as an assistant director in the film.

Plot
Naeema (Sakeena) a wealthy and reputed woman visits her homeland along with her husband to peace their mind after her unfortunate incidence of giving birth to a stillborn baby. They request Zubeydha (Aminath Rasheedha) to allow her daughter, Neeza (Mariyam Azza) to stay with them in Male' ensuring a prosperous and educated life, promising to love her as their own. Despondent, Zubeydha agreed to their terms concerning for Neeza's future, while Neeza squabbled to stay at the island having the fear of separating with her best-friend Ahmed, whom she hangouts with all day.

Years later, Ahmed (Ismail Wajeeh) visits Male' and was shocked when Neeza (Jamsheedha Ahmed) who now is in a romantic relationship with Shimau (Ali Shimree), fails to recognize him. Ahmed decided to stay in Male'. Having the need to consult a doctor, Zubeydha relocates to Male' and was astounded to see her disparate from her childhood life and liking. Neeza acts rude and cold-hearted towards Zubeydha, treats her like a servant in the house. Ahmed, established himself as a victorious man through burden and struggles, and is now the head of a successful company while changing his complete identity omitting his surname for its forlorn attachments.

Preparations for Neeza and Shimau's wedding commences, discomforting Zubeydha, since she has promised Hussain (Abdul Raheem) and Saeedha (Mariyam Haleem) to wed her daughter to Ahmed. Imran starts a romantic relationship with his secretary, Sama (Mariyam Nazima). After meeting reformed Imran, Neeza falls for him and starts avoiding Shimau. At her birthday party, Imran sends her a necklace which she handed over to him as a memory of her during their childhood. Neeza realizing the grave mistake and discovering his identity runs to meet him where she witnesses Imran with Sama leaving the party.

Cast 
 Ismail Wajeeh as Ahmed Imran
 Jamsheedha Ahmed as Neeza
 Ali Shimree as Shimau
 Mariyam Nazima as Sama
 Aminath Rasheedha as Zubeydha
 Ibrahim Rasheed
 Sakeena as Naeema
 Mariyam Haleem as Saeedha
 Abdul Raheem as Hussain
 Mariyam Azza as Neeza

Soundtrack

References

2000 drama films
Maldivian drama films
Dhivehi-language films